Linnicher Mühlenteich (also: Teichbach, in its lower course: Erlenbach) is a stream in North Rhine-Westphalia, western Germany. It is an artificial branch of the River Rur between Linnich and Hückelhoven.

See also
List of rivers of North Rhine-Westphalia

References

Rivers of North Rhine-Westphalia
0Linnicher Muhlenteich
Rivers of Germany